Futuximab (992 DS) (INN) is a chimeric monoclonal antibody designed for the treatment of cancer. It acts as an immunomodulator and also binds to HER1.

This drug was developed by Symphogen.

References 

Monoclonal antibodies for tumors
Experimental cancer drugs